In geometry, the great icosacronic hexecontahedron (or great sagittal trisicosahedron) is the dual of the great icosicosidodecahedron. Its faces are darts. A part of each dart lies inside the solid, hence is invisible in solid models.

Proportions 
Its dihedral angles equal .

References

External links 

Dual uniform polyhedra